Morgan School is a historic Rosenwald School located at Bailey, Nash County, North Carolina.  It was built in 1925–1926, and is a one-story, side-gabled shallow "T" frame building on a brick foundation. The school contained two classrooms and measures roughly 30 feet by 60 feet.  The school closed in 1956, and it was converted to a private residence soon after.

It was listed on the National Register of Historic Places in 2006.

References

Rosenwald schools in North Carolina
School buildings on the National Register of Historic Places in North Carolina
School buildings completed in 1926
Buildings and structures in Nash County, North Carolina
National Register of Historic Places in Nash County, North Carolina
1926 establishments in North Carolina